Khatchík or Khatchig is an Armenian given name (now it is a diminutive of Khachatur). Notable people with the name include:

 Khachig I — Catholicos of the Armenian Apostolic Church between 973 and 992.
 Gurgen-Khachik Artsruni (died 1003) — Lord of Rechtuniq, King of Vaspurakan (991-1003) — Brother of Ashot-Sahak
 Khachik Dashtents - writer
 Khatchig Babikian (1924-1999) was a philanthropist, attorney, former member of the Lebanese Parliament (1957-1999) a Lebanese politician of Armenian origin.
 Khachik Babayan —  renowned Iranian violin player.

Armenian given names